Merdivenli is a village in Dikili district of İzmir Province, Turkey.  It is situated to the south of Dikili.  The population of Merdivenli is 204. as of 2011.

References

Villages in Dikili District